The 1909-10 English football season was the 22nd season in the Football League for Aston Villa, who finished the season as the league's champions for a then record sixth time.

This season saw a straight fight between Villa and Liverpool and they finished well clear of the rest. Villa’s record included a 15-match run without defeat. They built on this to finish five points ahead of Liverpool. The Villa team included centre-forward Harry Hampton and inside-forward Joe Bache. In their Villa careers, Hampton scored 213 goals in 338 appearances and Bache 167 in 431. Hampton was just 5 ft 8in tall and was a fearless, fast moving player on the field. The ever-present outside-right Charlie Wallace also enjoyed a long career at the club, scoring 54 goals in 314 League games.

This would be Villa's last league title for 71 years, until they won the 1981 title. Arsenal finally matched Villa's record of six top division titles in 1948 and exceeded it with their seventh title in 1953.

Final League table

External links
AVFC History: 1909-10 season

Aston Villa F.C. seasons
Aston Villa F.C.
1910